Motorpsycho presents The International Tussler Society is an album by The International Tussler Society. It was released on CD and double vinyl, both editions came with a bonus DVD featuring a documentary about the recording process of the album, made by local director Frode Dreier. Also featured was the promotional video for "Satan's favourite Son". This song and "Laila Lou" were also given to radio stations as promo singles, but not released publicly.

To promote the album, the band toured Europe in fall 2004.

Track listing
Highway Zen  – 3:58
That ol' white Line  – 3:12
The West ain't what it used to be  – 5:05
September  – 4:49
Satan's favourite Son  – 3:55
Laila Lou  – 3:41
Back in your Bed  – 3:41
When we were One  – 2:06
Shitbox Ford  – 3:06
Morning Rain  – 5:08
The Skies are full of ...Wine?  – 4:57
Cassie (call on me)  – 6:25

All songs written by Sæther, except #2, #4 by Sæther/Lien, #11 by Sæther/Gebhardt, and #10 by Gebhardt/Gregory.
vinyl edition: Side A: 1-4, Side B; 5-9, Side C: 10-12, Side D: etching by Doc Wör Mirran

Personnel
Barry "Space" Hillien (Lars Lien): Lead vocals, keyboards
Kjell "K.K." Karlsen: pedal steel guitar, vocals; lead vocal on #9
Duellin' Flint Gebhardt (Håkon Gebhardt): banjo, guitars, vocals; lead vocal on #10
Chickenshakin' Lolly Hanks Jr. (Morten Fagervik): drums, percussion; bass on #8
Ringo "Fire" Karlsen AKA The Kid (Even Granås): drums, percussion, acoustic guitar, vocals
Snakebite Ryan (Hans Magnus Ryan): electric & acoustic guitars, mandolin, vocals
Charlie Bob Bent (Bent Sæther): bass, acoustic & electric guitars, percussion, vocals; lead vocal on #11, drums on #5

Miscellanea

This album came ten years after the first album by the band, The Tussler - Original Motion Picture Soundtrack.
The use of two drum kits on this record was inspired by bands like The Grateful Dead and The Allman Brothers Band.
"Cassie" is a song dedicated to the deceased backup singer for Lynyrd Skynyrd, Cassie Gaines (said by Bent Sæther during a concert in Berlin, October 13, 2004).
"Satan's favourite Son" was the only track not to be recorded during the winter/spring 2004-session in Stuggudalen, since it was committed to tape two years earlier. This is also the reason why Bent Sæther plays the second drum set on this song, as Even Grånas joined the band in 2003.
The artwork was done by Jonny Snorkel and Ronja Svenning Berge. The sleeve features drawings in wild west-style of the band members. 
Lars Lien's dog, Laila Lou, is credited for "Good vibes and vocals", as her barking is audible at the end of the song named after her.

2004 albums
Motorpsycho albums